Temperanceville is a census-designated place (CDP) in Accomack County, Virginia, United States. It was first listed as a CDP in 2010. As of the 2020 census, it had a population of 308.

Temperanceville was originally built up chiefly by Quakers.

It lies at an elevation of 43 feet.

Demographics

2020 census

Note: the US Census treats Hispanic/Latino as an ethnic category. This table excludes Latinos from the racial categories and assigns them to a separate category. Hispanics/Latinos can be of any race.

References

Census-designated places in Accomack County, Virginia
Census-designated places in Virginia